Professional Skills Institute (PSI) is a private for-profit technical school in Maumee, Ohio, US. PSI specializes in training for allied health professions and offers associate degree and diploma programs.

History
In 1984, a registered nurse named Patricia Finch founded PSI. The classes were originally taught in an office space along Airport Highway, as there were only 2 students taking part in 2 programs. Currently, PSI is located on Holland Road and has 300 enrolled students.

References

External links
Official website

Private universities and colleges in Ohio
Education in Toledo, Ohio
1984 establishments in Ohio
Educational institutions established in 1984